The Establishment is a term used to describe a dominant group or elite that controls a polity or an organization. It may comprise a closed social group that selects its own members, or entrenched elite structures in specific institutions. One can refer to any relatively small class or group of people who can exercise control as The Establishment. Conversely, in the jargon of sociology, anyone who does not belong to The Establishment may be labelled an outsider (as opposed to an "insider"). Anti-authoritarian anti-establishment ideologies question the legitimacy of establishments, seeing their influence on society as undemocratic.

The term in its modern sense was popularized by the British journalist Henry Fairlie, who in September 1955 in the London magazine The Spectator defined the network of prominent, well-connected people as "the Establishment". He wrote:

Following that, the term the Establishment was quickly picked up in newspapers and magazines all over London, making Fairlie famous. The Oxford English Dictionary cites Fairlie's column as its  origin. The use of the term Establishment also reflects the British term, established church, for the official Church of England. The term quickly became useful in discussing the power elites in many other countries, for example, the Soviet Union Nomenklatura. It is used as a loanword in many other languages.

Australia 
The term, establishment is often used in Australia to refer both to the main political parties and also to the powers behind those parties. In the book, Anti-political Establishment Parties: A Comparative Analysis by Amir Abedi (2004), Amir Abedi refers to the Labor Party and the Coalition Parties (the Liberal Party and the National/Country Party) as the establishment parties.

Canada 
The original Canadian Establishment began as a mix between the British and American models, combining political appointments and business acumen.  In Francophone Canada, the local leaders of the Catholic Church played a major role. The Family Compact is the first identifiable Canadian Establishment in Anglophone Canada.

The journalist Peter C. Newman defined the modern Canadian Establishment in his 1975 book The Canadian Establishment. It catalogued the richest individuals and families living in Canada at the time. All of the specific people he identified were prominent business leaders, especially in the media and in public transit. Newman reports that several of these old families have maintained their importance into the twenty-first century.

According to Anglo-American journalist Peter Brimelow, Newman's establishment was overshadowed by a new class. His book The Patriot Game "makes a swinging attack on the political, bureaucratic, and academic establishment whose entire well-being rests on the promotion of Canadian nationalism. [He] identifies the federal Liberal Party as the selfish and thoughtless inventor of this modern activity of creating a Canadian identity, he argues that it is now a pervasive disease throughout Canada's national political and cultural elite."

Hong Kong
The term is also used in politics of Hong Kong, where political parties, community groups, chambers of commerce, trade unions and individuals who are cooperative with and loyal to the Chinese Communist Party and the post-handover Hong Kong Government are labelled (most often self-labelled) "pro-Beijing" or "pro-establishment". The term first appeared in 2004.

Ireland
The term "Official Ireland" is commonly used in the Republic of Ireland to denote the media, cultural and religious establishment.

Pakistan 

In Pakistan, the term "The Establishment" refers to the military and their relations with the intelligence community and high-level political officials that allow them to exert dominance over the government.

United Kingdom
The United Kingdom has numerous entrenched groups that are regarded as forming the establishment: these include the royal family, the aristocracy, the landed gentry, the privy council, senior civil servants, lawyers, academics, Church of England clergy, financiers, industrialists, the armed services and other professionals.

United States

In the United States, the term typically references the two party system, which are oftentimes seen as similar to each other in regards to their anti-labor practices, unflinchingly pro-federal policy, and vehement defense of corporate interests. It also harkens back to the original coinage of the term in 1955, referencing the intricate power and reach held within the matrix of corrupt connections between corporations, said politicians, government agencies, and some internet based social groups.

It can also refer to White Anglo-Saxon Protestants (WASPs), who constitute a majority of the social elites who have dominated American society, culture, and politics for most of the history of the United States, enjoying advantages in various matters such as education, voting rights and land acquisition. In the 1950s, WASP hegemony faced criticism by the emerging New Left. Some prominent American families have held disproportionate wealth and wielded disproportionate political power over the decades. Experts talk about what C. Wright Mills called the "power elite", and about leadership communities in policy areas such as foreign policy.  Many of these families often have ties to older East Coast cities such as Boston, New York City, Philadelphia and Newport, Rhode Island.  One such group of interconnected elite families is the Boston Brahmins.  Many in the East Coast establishment have ties to Ivy League colleges and to prep schools in New England and the Northeast.  In the Southern United States, the First Families of Virginia are an example of the Establishment.

Traditionally, WASP and Protestant establishment families have been associated with Episcopal (or Anglican), Presbyterian, United Methodist, Congregationalist, and other mainline Protestant denominations. According to the Pew Research Center, the Episcopal Church "has often been seen as the religious institution most closely associated with the American establishment, producing many of the nation's most important leaders in politics and business."

Inside the American Sociological Association, the term is often used by those protesting a small clique that controls the organisation. In 1968, a group of academics formed the "Sociology Liberation Movement" (SLM) in order to repudiate the leadership of the American Sociological Association itself, which the SLM referred to as the "Establishment in American sociology".

See also

 Anti-establishment
 Cabal
 Cronyism
 Deep State
 Drain the swamp
 Established church
 Iron law of oligarchy
 Liberal elite
 New World Order
 Power to the people
 Ruling party
 The Man

References

Further reading

 Campbell, Fergus. The Irish Establishment 1879–1914 (2009)
 Dogan, Mattéi, Elite configurations at the apex of power (2003)
 Hennessy, Peter. The great and the good: an inquiry into the British establishment (Policy Studies Institute, 1986)
 Jones, Owen. The Establishment – and how they get away with it (Penguin, 2015)
 Kauppi, N. and Madsen, M.R., eds. Transnational Power Elites: The New Professionals of Governance, Law and Security (Routledge, 2013). online
 Page, E.C. People Who Run Europe (1997).
 Rovere, Richard. The American establishment and other reports, opinions, and speculations (1962), a famous spoof;  it is online
 Silk, Leonard Solomon and Mark Silk. American Establishment (1980)
 Valentine, C. The British Establishment, 1760-1784: An Eighteenth-Century Biographical Dictionary (University of Oklahoma Press, 1970)
 Wodak, Ruth. "The “Establishment”, the “Élites”, and the “People”." Journal of Language and Politics 16.4 (2017): 551-565. online

Sociolinguistics
Social groups
Political terminology
Oligarchy
Politics of the United Kingdom
Politics of the United States
Military science